Jean-Marie Le Chevallier (22 November 1936 – 30 October 2020) was a French politician.

Early life
Jean-Marie Le Chevallier was born on 22 November 1936 in Sceaux, near Paris.

Career
Le Chevallier started his career as Jacques Dominati's parliamentary assistant. He was introduced to Jean-Marie Le Pen by Dominati, who was one of his personal friends. Le Chevallier subsequently joined Le Pen's National Front. He served as a member of the National Assembly representing the Var from 1997 to 1998. However, he was forced to step down due to campaign finance violations.

He also served as the Mayor of Toulon from 1995 to 1999.

Personal life
He was married to Cendrine Chéreil de la Rivière, who ran for the National Assembly and lost. They lived in Marrakesh, Morocco, for several years. As of 2009, he resided in an apartment at the Quai Louis-Blériot in the 16th arrondissement of Paris.

He died on 30 October 2020.

Bibliography
Le Chevallier à découvert, Jean-Pierre Thiollet, Ed. Laurens, 1998.

References

1936 births
2020 deaths
People from Sceaux, Hauts-de-Seine
Politicians from Île-de-France
National Rally (France) politicians
Deputies of the 11th National Assembly of the French Fifth Republic
Mayors of Toulon
Members of Parliament for Var